A box-spring (or divan in some countries) is a type of bed base typically consisting of a sturdy wooden frame covered in cloth and containing springs. Usually the box-spring is placed on top of a wooden or metal bedframe that sits on the floor and acts as a brace, except in the UK where the divan is more often fitted with small casters. The box-spring is usually the same size as the much softer mattress that is placed on it. Working together, the box-spring and mattress (with optional bed frame) make up a bed. It is common to find a box-spring and mattress being used together without the support of a frame underneath, the box spring being mounted directly on casters standing on the floor.

Purpose 

The purpose of a box-spring mainly lies in the trade-off between ventilating the bed through the bottom and structural stability of the box-spring itself.

Purposes 
 Elevating the mattress above the ground, increasing the ease of getting into bed and getting out of bed;
 Providing ventilation and allow body moisture to escape, preventing mildew;
 Creating a relatively flat and firm structure for the mattress to lie upon;
 Enhancing aesthetics or design-style value. (i.e., socioculturally and sociopsychologically, the bed may be seen to take up more space, potentially creating a sense of significance to the space, and a sense of value because of the money spent on the box-spring (versus simply paying for only a mattress, that would be thrown on the ground to be slept on without a box-spring or another furnishing that would elevate the mattress). However, these hedonic aspects are not universal but are likely specific to Western societies See Interior Design Psychology for more.)

Note 

The following points are assumed or suggested to be purposes and reasons for using a box-spring. However, such assumption are not true, and are likely selling points in a sales pitch:
 to make the mattress more comfortable to sleep on;
 to absorb shock and reduce wear on the mattress.

History 

The first rectangular spring-cushioned wire frames to support mattresses did not have wood rims or cloth covers.  These were called bedsprings. More and more box-springs are being made out of wood, then covered in fabrics. Wood makes a better support system for the newer memory foam and latex mattresses. The newest design in box-springs is the folding box spring made of wood or metal, then covered in fabric which can fold in half and can be sent by shipping and courier companies.

With the increasing height of mattresses, manufacturers now make box springs in different heights so that the mattress and box spring pair maintain a standard height. Changing the thickness of the box spring and mattress require revisions to the mattress and box spring coil stiffness. This is often why box springs and mattresses are matched and sold in pairs.

Alternatives 

Box-spring beds are especially popular in North America and Western Europe.

Alternatively, in Japan, futon mattresses are usually either placed on a bedframe or on the floor, without the use of springs.

In Europe, wooden frames with a middle section consisting of springs held in place by wire (to be put into the wooden bedframe as a unit) used to be the standard for most of the 20th century. The springs have mostly been replaced by pre-bent wooden slats (usually glued laminated timber made from beech or birch) which are joined to the outer wooden frame by some form of flexible rubber bolt, shoe or socket. This lath floor provides suspension, allows the mattress to ventilate, and can be designed to be vertically adjustable in order to elevate the legs and / or the torso. A more simple approach is to join straight laths with a textile strap so that they can be rolled up for transport and placed right into the bedframe.

References 

Bedding
Furniture
Upholstery